São Victor (also São Vítor) is a Portuguese parish, located in the municipality of Braga. The population in 2011 was 29,642, in an area of 4.08 km².

It is named after Saint Victor of Braga, an early Christian martyr who was put to death around AD 300.

Main sights

Sete Fontes

References

Freguesias of Braga